Anna Eastman is an American politician. She represented the 148th district in the Texas House of Representatives for under a year from February 2020 to January 2021. On July 14, 2020, Eastman was defeated in her re-election attempt by Penny Morales Shaw.

Political career

In 2009, Eastman ran for the District I seat on the Houston Independent School District board. With 41.73% of the vote, she advanced to the December 12 runoff election, which she narrowly won with 50.98% of the vote. She ran for re-election to the school board in 2013, and won with 77.41% of the vote.

In 2019, Eastman ran in a special general election to finish Jessica Farrar's term as the District 148 representative in the Texas House of Representatives, after Farrar announced her retirement. Eastman got 20.6% of the vote, which was the most of any of the six candidates, and advanced to a runoff against Republican Luis LaRotta. The runoff was held on January 28, 2020, and Eastman won with 65.5% of the vote.

Eastman was a candidate for election to a full term in the District 148 seat. She faced off against former congressional advocate and attorney, Penny Morales Shaw. Both candidates had advanced to a runoff election for the Democratic nomination on July 14, 2020.

Eastman sat on the House committees:
 Judiciary & Civil Jurisprudence
 Natural Resources

References

Living people
Politicians from Houston
University of Texas at Austin alumni
Our Lady of the Lake University alumni
21st-century American politicians
21st-century American women politicians
Democratic Party members of the Texas House of Representatives
Women state legislators in Texas
Year of birth missing (living people)